Paul Gough is a British academic, writer, painter, broadcaster and the current Principal and Vice Chancellor of Arts University Bournemouth.

Biography 
Gough was educated at Aberdeen Grammar School. He graduated from the Polytechnic Wolverhampton in 1979 and the Royal College of Art, London in 1985 with a Master’s degree in Painting. In 1991 he was awarded his PhD on First World War art.

Painting 
As a painter, Gough has exhibited globally is represented in several permanent art collections – including the National Arts Collection Fund, the Imperial War Museum, London; Canadian War Museum, and the National War Memorial, New Zealand.Gough was elected an Academician of the Royal West of England Academy in 2000.

Gough is a regular media commentator on the street artist Banksy. In 2022, a short film alleging Gough was the street artist went viral over TikTok, receiving more than two million views.

His most recent exhibitions have been in Melbourne, Australia, London, and Wellington, New Zealand. He was selected to exhibit in The Art of Creative Research NIE Gallery, Singapore in January 2023.

Writing 
As an author, Gough has published over 80 academic papers, and nine books  which cover the representation of war and peace, including several books on the British artist Stanley Spencer and a study of the work of John and Paul Nash which was published as part of a comprehensive suite of exhibitions, commissions and other events he curated during the centenary period of the First World War (2014–18).

In the past five years, Gough has given conference addresses and keynote speeches in Australia, New Zealand, Turkey, Macedonia, Belgium, France and UK.

Television, film and radio 
As a broadcaster, Gough worked for a decade as a television presenter, researcher and associate producer on a range of creative arts programmes and documentaries, including the award-winning documentary Redundant Warrior, about the photographer Don McCullin. Gough also has a credit for design research in the Aardman Animations feature film, Chicken Run.

Academia 
In addition to appointments on education and research panels in UK, Europe, Hong Kong and New Zealand, Gough was Deputy Vice-Chancellor at the University of the West of England, Bristol; and for six years, 2014-2019 Vice-President at RMIT University, Melbourne, Australia. In 2020, Gough became Principal and Vice-Chancellor of Arts University Bournemouth.

References 

Living people
Alumni of the Royal College of Art
British war artists
21st-century English painters
People associated with Arts University Bournemouth
Year of birth missing (living people)